Kennedy is a 1983 American-British five-hour television miniseries written by Reg Gadney and directed by Jim Goddard. The miniseries is a biography of the 1961-1963 presidency of John F. Kennedy. It  was co-produced by Alan Landsburg Productions and Central Independent Television and originally aired in the United States starting on 20 November 1983, and concluding on November 22, the 20th anniversary of Kennedy's assassination.

The miniseries stars Martin Sheen as President John F. Kennedy, Blair Brown as Jacqueline Kennedy, John Shea as Robert F. Kennedy, E. G. Marshall as Joseph P. Kennedy, Geraldine Fitzgerald as Rose Kennedy, Vincent Gardenia as J. Edgar Hoover, and Kelsey Grammer as Stephen Smith amongst many others.

The series was originally broadcast on NBC, and was also sold to 50 countries, with 27 of them broadcasting the series simultaneously.

Cast

 Martin Sheen as John F. Kennedy
 Blair Brown as Jacqueline Kennedy
 John Shea as Robert F. Kennedy
 E. G. Marshall as Joseph P. Kennedy
 Geraldine Fitzgerald as Rose Kennedy
 Vincent Gardenia as J. Edgar Hoover
 Kelsey Grammer as Stephen Smith
 Charles Brown as Martin Luther King Jr.
 Kevin Conroy as Edward M. Kennedy
 Nesbitt Blaisdell as Lyndon B. Johnson
 Tom Brennan as Adlai Stevenson
 Ellen Parker as Ethel Kennedy
 Donald Neal as Ralph Yarborough
 John Glover as Bill
 Jessica Ann Durr as Caroline Kennedy (ages 5–6)
 Hannah Fallon as Caroline Kennedy (ages 3–4)
 James Burge as Peter Lawford
 Peter Boyden as Pierre Salinger
 Laurie Kennedy as Patricia Kennedy Lawford
 Joe Lowry as Dave Powers
 Joanna Camp as Eunice Kennedy Shriver
 Al Conti as Sargent Shriver
 Frances Conroy as Jean Kennedy Smith
 Kent Broadhurst as Richard Paul Pavlick 
 Peggy Hewitt as Letitia Baldrige
 David Leary as Arthur Schlesinger Jr.
 Don MacLaughlin as Chief Justice Earl Warren
 Larry Keith as Stanley Levison
 Harry Madsen as Clint Hill
 Tanny McDonald as Lady Bird Johnson
 Carmen Mathews as Mamie Eisenhower
 David Schramm as Robert McNamara
 Janet Sheen as Elaine de Kooning
 Trey Wilson as Kenneth O'Donnell
 George Guidall as Nicholas Katzenbach
 Barton Heyman as Curtis LeMay
 J.R. Dusenberry as John Connally
 Margo Tully as Nellie Connally
 Satch Franklin as extra at armoury

Reception
The series was nominated for 3 Golden Globes and 4 BAFTA Awards, and won the latter for Best Drama Series and Best Make Up.

Nielsen Ratings
Part 1 averaged a 12.0/17, against The Day After, and ranked 54th out of 64 programs the week of November 14–20, 1983. However, Parts 2 and 3 both ranked in the Top 10 for the week, with Part 2 averaging a 22.3/34 and Part 3 averaging a 24.3/37. Out of 64 programs airing the week of November 21–27, 1983, Part 2 ranked 6th for the week, and Part 3 ranked 4th for the week.

See also
 Cultural depictions of John F. Kennedy

References

External links

1983 American television series debuts
1983 American television series endings
1983 British television series debuts
1983 British television series endings
1980s American television miniseries
1980s American drama television series
1980s British television miniseries
1980s British drama television series
American biographical series
American political drama television series
ITV television dramas
Films about John F. Kennedy
Films about Robert F. Kennedy
Films about the Kennedy family
Films about the Cuban Missile Crisis
Films directed by Jim Goddard
Television series by ITV Studios
British political drama television series
English-language television shows
Cultural depictions of John F. Kennedy
Cultural depictions of Robert F. Kennedy
Cultural depictions of Lyndon B. Johnson
Cultural depictions of Martin Luther King Jr.
Cultural depictions of J. Edgar Hoover
Cultural depictions of Jacqueline Kennedy Onassis
Television shows produced by Central Independent Television
Television series by Alan Landsburg Productions